Hayden Norris (born 21 August 2002) is an English international cyclist. He has represented England at the Commonwealth Games.

Biography
Norris has been riding since the age of 13 and won the 2021 European Under-23 Championships gold medal in the sprint. He won the silver medal in the team sprint at the 2022 British National Track Championships, a year after winning bronze in the same event.

In 2022, he was selected for the 2022 Commonwealth Games in Birmingham. He competed in three events; the men's sprint event where he finished in 19th place, the men's keirin event and the men's 1 km time trial.

References

2002 births
Living people
British male cyclists
British track cyclists
Cyclists at the 2022 Commonwealth Games
Commonwealth Games competitors for England